(15 November 1910 – 23 June 1984) was a Japanese film actor.

Filmography
The filmography of Yatarō Kurokawa includes 228 films from 1935 to 1971:

 A Mother's Love (1950)
 Gate of Hell (1953)
 Akō gishi (1954)
 Asatarō garasu (1956)
 The Renyasai Yagyu Hidden Story (1956)
Suzunosuke Akado: The One-Legged Demon (1957)
 The Loyal 47 Ronin (忠臣蔵 Chūshingura) (1958)
 Nichiren to Mōko Daishūrai (1958)

References

External links

1910 births
1984 deaths
Japanese male film actors
People from Yokohama
20th-century Japanese male actors